Famous Food is a VH1 reality series that premiered 10 July 2011. It features seven celebrities as they work to open and take ownership in a restaurant in Hollywood owned by Mike Malin (who competed in Big Brother 2 and Big Brother 7: All-Stars, which he won) and Lonnie Moore of The Dolce Group. Due to low ratings, VH1 announced on July 15 that the show will move to Wednesdays 8/7c beginning July 20. DJ Paul was the winner of the partnership but after a twist the judges awarded a second partnership to Danielle Staub. The restaurant created on the show, named "Lemon Basket", was closed after just 5 months.

Format
The contestants will work to launch Famous Food, a Hollywood restaurant, with their skills being tested in challenges. At the season's end, the winner will be given a partnership stake in the business.

Contestants

Production
In 2011, various cast members were seen filming for an upcoming reality series. On April 21, 2011, the series was confirmed by VH1. On the same day, cast member Heidi Montag talked about the series on On Air with Ryan Seacrest, saying it "is about several celebrities coming together and building a restaurant, and working in it, and kind of figuring out the in’s and outs of the restaurant business, and how to be successful in it."

Episodes

Ratings
The show's first two episodes, which aired on July 10 & 17 averaged 0.43 million viewers and a 0.2 rating in adults 18–49, making it the lowest rated  VH1 show of the season. Resulting in not returning for a second season.

References

 Ashley Dupre Cribs Blue Ribbon Menu on Famous Food

2011 American television series debuts
2011 American television series endings
2010s American reality television series
English-language television shows
Food reality television series
VH1 original programming
Television series by 51 Minds Entertainment